The following is the complete List of compositions by Moritz Moszkowski. Both tables (works with and without opus number) are sortable by title, key, tempo, and year (date of composition, from start to end when applicable), and non-sortable by opus or MoszWV (Moszkowski Werkverzeichnis — Moszkowski work directory) numbers, name or movement of the composition, genre and notes, where additional information on Moszkowski's life and his compositions has been displayed. The font-size of both tables has been adjusted to 96% and all the information has been centered to ease the reading of every piece, the way that every opus number a, b or c has been marked in gray for the same purpose. The dark gray line  immediately under Opus 58b and MoszWV 205 (15a, 15b, 55a, 56a, 56b, 56c, MoszWV 67-73, 120 and 174 were written after 1896) functions as a chronological divider for Moszkowski's life in Berlin (before 1897), and in Paris (from 1897 on), when the information is then sorted by year.

Genre

Works with opus number

Works without opus number

Additional information

External links
 Moritz Moszkowski's compositions selected by Work Types at Category Walker - IMSLP

 
Moszkowski, Moritz